Pope Callixtus II or Callistus II ( – 13 December 1124), born Guy of Burgundy, was head of the Catholic Church and ruler of the Papal States from 1 February 1119 to his death in 1124. His pontificate was shaped by the Investiture Controversy, which he was able to settle through the Concordat of Worms in 1122.

As son of Count William I of Burgundy, Guy was a member of and connected to the highest nobility in Europe. He became archbishop of Vienne and served as papal legate to France. He attended the Lateran Synod of 1112. He was elected pope at Cluny in 1119. The following year, prompted by attacks on Jews, he issued the bull Sicut Judaeis which forbade Christians, on pain of excommunication, from forcing Jews to convert, from harming them, from taking their property, from disturbing the celebration of their festivals, and from interfering with their cemeteries. In March 1123, Calixtus II convened the First Lateran Council which passed several disciplinary decrees, such as those against simony and concubinage among the clergy, and violators of the Truce of God.

Early life
Born the fourth son of Count William I of Burgundy, one of the wealthiest rulers in Europe, Guy was a member of the highest aristocracy in Europe. His family was part of a network of noble alliances. He was a cousin of Arduin of Ivrea, the king of Italy. One sister, Gisela, was married to Count Humbert II of Savoy and then to Renier I of Montferrat; another sister, Maud, was the wife of Duke Odo I of Burgundy. Another sister, Clementia, married Count Robert II of Flanders. His brother Raymond was married to Urraca, the queen of León, and fathered the future King Alfonso VII of León. His brother Hugh was archbishop of Besançon.

Archbishop of Vienne

Guy first appears in contemporary records when he became the archbishop of Vienne in 1088. He held strong pro-papal views about the Investiture controversy. As archbishop, he was appointed papal legate to France by Pope Paschal II during the time that Paschal was induced under pressure from Holy Roman Emperor Henry V to issue the Privilegium of 1111, by which he yielded much of the papal prerogatives that had been so forcefully claimed by Pope Gregory VII in the Gregorian Reforms. These concessions were received with violent opposition and nowhere more so than in France, where the opposition was led by Archbishop Guy, who had attended the Lateran Synod of 1112.

On his return to France, he immediately convened an assembly of French and Burgundian bishops at Vienne, where the imperial claim to a traditional lay investiture of the clergy was denounced as heretical and a sentence of excommunication was now pronounced against Henry V on the grounds that he had extorted the Privilegium from Paschal II by means of violence. The council called Pope Paschal a simpleton (quod rex extorsit a vestra simplicitate). These decrees were sent to Paschal II with a request for a confirmation, which they received on 20 October 1112.

Papacy

Paschal does not seem to have been quite pleased with Guy's zeal in his attacks upon Henry V. During the violent confrontations between Henry V and Paschal II's successor, Pope Gelasius II, the pope was forced to flee from Rome, first to Gaeta, where he was crowned, then to the Cluny Abbey, where he died on 29 January 1119. Guy was elected at Cluny on 2 February 1119. Nine cardinals took part in the election. Most of the other cardinals were in Rome. He was crowned at Vienne on 9 February 1119 as Calixtus II.

At the outset, it appeared that the new pope was willing to negotiate with Henry V, who received the papal embassy at Strasbourg, and withdrew his support from the antipope he had proclaimed at Rome. It was agreed that pope and emperor should meet at the Château de Mousson, near Rheims, and in October the new Pope opened the council at Rheims attended by Louis VI of France with most of the barons of France and more than four hundred bishops and abbots. Henry V arrived for his personal conference at Mousson — not alone, as had been anticipated, but with an army of over thirty thousand men. Calixtus II, fearing that force was likely to be used to extract prejudicial concessions, remained at Rheims. There, Calixtus II busied himself ineffectively with attempting a reconciliation between the brothers Henry I of England and Robert II of Normandy, and the council dealt with disciplinary regulations and decrees against lay investiture, simony, and clerical concubines. Since there was no compromise coming from Henry V, it was determined on 30 October 1119 that the Emperor and his antipope should be solemnly excommunicated.

Returning to Italy, where antipope Gregory VIII was supported in Rome by imperial forces and Italian allies of the emperor, Calixtus II managed to gain the upper hand amid clear demonstrations of popular support. The Imperial candidate was obliged to flee to the fortress of Sutri, where he was taken prisoner through the intervention of Norman support from the Kingdom of Sicily. He was transferred from prison to prison first near Salerno, and afterwards at the fortress of Fumo. The imperial allies in Rome soon disbanded.

Sicut Judaeis
In 1120 Calixtus II issued the papal bull Sicut Judaeis (Latin: "As the Jews") setting out the official position of the papacy regarding the treatment of Jews. It was prompted by the First Crusade, during which over five thousand Jews were slaughtered in Europe. The bull was intended to protect Jews and echoed the position of Pope Gregory I that Jews were entitled to "enjoy their lawful liberty". The bull forbade Christians, on pain of excommunication, from forcing Jews to convert, from harming them, from taking their property, from disturbing the celebration of their festivals, and from interfering with their cemeteries. It was reaffirmed by popes Alexander III, Celestine III (1191–1198), Innocent III (1199), Honorius III (1216), Gregory IX (1235), Innocent IV (1246), Alexander IV (1255), Urban IV (1262), Gregory X (1272 & 1274), Nicholas III, Martin IV (1281), Honorius IV (1285–1287), Nicholas IV (1288–92), Clement VI (1348), Urban V (1365), Boniface IX (1389), Martin V (1422), and Nicholas V (1447).

Concordat of Worms

Having established his power in Italy, the pope resolved to re-open negotiations with Henry V on the question of investiture. Henry V was anxious to put an end to a controversy which had reduced imperial authority in Germany — terminally so, as it appeared in the long run. An embassy of three cardinals was sent by Calixtus II to Germany, and negotiations for a permanent settlement of the investiture struggle were begun in October 1121 at Würzburg, where it was agreed that a general truce should be proclaimed in Germany, that the Church should have free use of its possessions, and that the lands of those in rebellion should be restored. These decrees were communicated to Calixtus II, who despatched the legate Lambert to assist at the synod that had been convoked at Worms, where, on 23 September 1122, the agreement known as the Concordat of Worms was concluded. On his side the Emperor abandoned his claim to investiture with ring and crosier, and granted freedom of election to episcopal sees. On the papal side, it was conceded that the bishops should receive investiture with the sceptre, that the episcopal elections should be held in the presence of the emperor or his representatives, that in case of disputed elections the emperor should, after the decision of the metropolitan and the suffragan bishops, confirm the rightfully elected candidate, and lastly, that the imperial investiture of the temporal properties connected to the sees should take place in Germany before the consecration. In Burgundy and in Italy the imperial investiture would take place after the consecration ceremony, while in the Papal States the pope alone had the right of investiture, without any interference on the part of the emperor. As a result of this Concordat, the emperor still retained in his hands the controlling influence in the election of the bishops in Germany, though he had abandoned much in regard to episcopal elections in Italy and Burgundy.

First Lateran Council

To secure the confirmation of this Concordat of Worms, Calixtus II convened the First Lateran Council on 18 March 1123. It solemnly confirmed the Concordat and passed several disciplinary decrees, such as those against simony and concubinage among the clergy. Decrees were also passed against violators of the Truce of God, church-robbers, and forgers of ecclesiastical documents. The indulgences already granted to the crusaders were renewed, and the jurisdiction of the bishops over the clergy, both secular and regular, was more clearly defined.

Later life, death and legacy
Calixtus II devoted his last few years to re-establishing papal control over the Roman Campagna and establishing the primacy of his former prince-archbishopric, the See of Vienne over the long-time rival See of Arles. He also affirmed the authority of the bishop of Lyons over the church at Sens in France, transferred the historic bishopric of Mérida in Spain to Santiago de Compostela, and rebuilt the church of Santa Maria in Cosmedin in Rome.

Calixtus died on 13 December 1124. A decade or two later, a French scholar (probably Aymeric Picaud) began composing a combination of miracle tales, liturgical texts and travelers guide relating to the increasingly popular pilgrimage route from southern France through northern Spain now called the Camino de Santiago. The work (published before 1173) was called the Liber Sant Jacobi (Book of St. James) or the Codex Calixtinus, since a letter introduction attributed to this pope preceded each of the five chapters. Several of his authentic letters have also been preserved.

References

 
1060s births
1124 deaths
Year of birth uncertain
People from Doubs
12th-century Roman Catholic archbishops in France
Archbishops of Vienne
Investiture Controversy
Diplomats of the Holy See
Anscarids
11th-century French people
12th-century French people
Popes
12th-century popes
French popes
Burials at the Archbasilica of Saint John Lateran